Psilaxis is a genus of sea snails, marine gastropod mollusks in the family Architectonicidae, the staircase shells or sundials.

Species
Species within the genus Psilaxis include:
 Psilaxis clertoni Tenório, Barros, Francisco & Silva, 2011
 Psilaxis krebsii (Mörch, 1875)
 Psilaxis oxytropis (A. Adams, 1855)
 Psilaxis radiatus (Röding, 1798)

References

 Bieler R. (1993). Architectonicidae of the Indo-Pacific (Mollusca, Gastropoda). Abhandlungen des Naturwissenschaftlichen Vereins in Hamburg (NF) 30: 1-376 [15 December]. page(s): 116
 Rolán E., 2005. Malacological Fauna From The Cape Verde Archipelago. Part 1, Polyplacophora and Gastropoda.

External links
  Woodring W.P.B. (1928). Miocene mollusks from Bowden, Jamaica. 2. Gastropods and discussion of results. Carnegie Institution of Washington Publication. 385: vii + 564 pp., 40 pls.

Architectonicidae